Ernest Bediako Sampong (born June, 1956) is a Ghanaian Pharmacist and Businessman. He is the Founder and chief executive officer of Ernest Chemist and was awarded The Man of The Year at EMYAfrica Awards 2020.

Early life and education 
He had his secondary education at Adisadel College in Cape Coast, Ghana. He furthered at the University of Ghana Medical School but he later drop to attend Kwame Nkrumah University of Science and Technology, where he acquire Bachelor of Science degree in Pharmacy

Career 
He is the CEO of Ernest Chemist Limited, a pharmaceutical company that retail, distribute and manufactures Drugs. In 2009, He founded NestPharma Company Limited in Freetown, Sierra Leone .

Achievements and Awards 
Ernest have won awards and recognition in entrepreneurship and pharmacy.

References 

1956 births
Ghanaian businesspeople
Living people
Kwame Nkrumah University of Science and Technology alumni